The Cali Condors are a professional swimming club and one of the original eight clubs of the International Swimming League. The team is based in San Francisco led by general manager Jason Lezak and head coach Gregg Troy.  Assistant Coaches for the 2019 Season were Dean Boxall, Jeff Julian, and Linda Kiefer.

During the inaugural season in 2019 they earned their spot in the final as one of the top two teams in their division. They finished the season as the top American team in the league ahead of their rival LA Current.

The Condors won their first International Swimming League Championship during the 2020 Season in Budapest, Hungary.   They were led by Head Coach Jonty Skinner, and assistant coaches Allison Beebe, Sean Schimmel, and Brian Schrader.

Head coaches
Gregg Troy (2019, 2021)
Jonty Skinner (2020)

2019 International Swimming League season

Team roster 
ISL teams had a maximum roster of 32 athletes for 2019 season, with a suggested size of each club's traveling roster of 28 (14 men and 14 women). Each club had a captain and a vice-captain of different gender. The Condors had a majority of Americans on their team with athletes from five other countries around the world.

Match results 
In the 2019 (inaugural) ISL season, the Condors finished in 3rd place in the final.

2020 International Swimming League season

Team roster

Match results

2021 International Swimming League season

Team roster

Match results

References 

International Swimming League
Swimming clubs
Sports teams in San Francisco
Swim teams in the United States